Oscinella frit is a European species of fly and member of the family Chloropidae.  Oscinella frit is an agricultural pest causing damage to crops by boring into the shoots of oats, wheat, maize, barley and grasses.

References

External links
Pest Information Wiki

Oscinellinae
Diptera of Europe
Flies described in 1758
Agricultural pest insects
Taxa named by Carl Linnaeus